National Highway 953, commonly called NH 953 is a national highway in India. It is a spur road of National Highway 53. NH-953 traverses the states of Gujarat and Maharashtra in India.

Route 
Songadh, Subir Ahwa, Saputara, Vani, Pimpalgaon Baswant.

Junctions  

  Terminal near Songadh.
  Terminal near Pimpalgaon Baswant.

See also 
 List of National Highways in India by highway number
 List of National Highways in India by state

References

External links 

 NH 953 on OpenStreetMap

National highways in India
National Highways in Gujarat
National Highways in Maharashtra